Moonrunners is a 1975 action comedy film starring James Mitchum, about a Southern family who runs bootleg liquor. It was reworked four years later into the popular long-running television series The Dukes of Hazzard, and the two productions share some similarities. Mitchum had co-starred with his father, Robert Mitchum, in the similar drive-in favorite Thunder Road 18 years earlier, which also focused upon moonshine-running bootleggers using fast cars to elude federal agents. Moonrunners, a B movie, was filmed in 1973 and awaited release for over a year.  Its soundtrack reflects the outlaw music boom of the 1970s during which the film was released.

The film was written and directed by Gy Waldron and is based on the life and stories of ex-moonshiner Jerry Rushing, who has a small role in the movie as a heavy at the Boar's Nest bar. It is listed in the book The Greatest Movie Car Chases of All Time.

Plot 
The story is narrated by the Balladeer (Waylon Jennings), who introduces and comments on the story of cousins, Grady and Bobby Lee Hagg, who run bootleg liquor for their uncle Jesse Hagg of Shiloh County.

Uncle Jesse is a Baptist who knows the Bible better than the local preacher.  He has been a widower since Aunt Libby died 10 years ago.  He still makes liquor, according to his "granddaddy's granddaddy's" recipe, in stills named Molly and Beulah.  Every drop is aged two years, and bottled in glass (never plastic).  The Haggs have been making their recipe since before the Revolutionary War, and Jesse only sells to a friend in nearby Florence to ensure that his liquor is never blended with any other.

Bobby Lee (also called "Lee") is a smart-mouthed schemer, named after Confederate General Robert E. Lee.  In the opening, Bobby Lee is placed in the Pikkens County jail for a bar fight at the Boar's Nest.  On his way home, he helps Beth Ann Eubanks, who is on the run from family trouble in Mississippi.  Uncle Jesse lodges her at his home, and Lee courts her.

Grady is a laconic "Romeo" who drives their 1955 Chevrolet stock car (#54, named Traveller after General Lee's horse).   Grady is briefly mentioned as probably having a number of children around Shiloh and Tennessee (in the pilot episode of The Dukes of Hazzard, "One Armed Bandits", Bo half-jokes that half of the children in the local orphanage could be his cousin Luke's, although this and similar concepts were quickly dropped as the series found its more family-friendly tone).

The cousins take Beth to the next race at the local track.  The other stock-car drivers include "good ol' boy" Zeebo, and Zeebo's lackey Cooter Pettigrew.   Zeebo (driving #31) and Cooter (driving #28) team up to beat Grady in the race, leading to a moonlit bootlegger road race between Bobby Lee and Zeebo.

The county boss is Jake Rainey, a friend of Jesse's from the old days, when they both bootlegged for Jesse's father in 1934, and owner of the local bar and brothel.  Jake has control of all the other moonshine in the county, and sells it to the New York syndicate (mob).  He needs Jesse's supply to fill an order, but Jesse will not sell to Jake, since he would mix it with lesser-quality liquor.

To get at Jesse's supply, Jake uses Sheriff Rosco Coltrane to harass the cousins.  At the same time, he uses Zeebo and Reba (Jake's wife who is having an affair with Grady) to goad the boys into a trap.  During these events, Uncle Jesse calls Jake "hog" (effectively making Jake "Boss Hogg") as a put-down. Uncle Jesse dies after attempting to make a moonshine run. The cousins, who are on probation and cannot own guns, use a bow with explosive arrows to put Jake Rainey's moonshining factory out of business.

Cast

 James Mitchum as Grady Hagg
 Kiel Martin as Bobby Lee Hagg
 Arthur Hunnicutt as Uncle Jesse Hagg
 Chris Forbes as Beth Ann Eubanks
 George Ellis as Jake Rainey
 Pete Munro as Zeebo
 Joan Blackman as Reba Rainey
 Waylon Jennings as the Balladeer
 Spanky McFarlane as Precious, Jake's bartender
 Joey Giordello as a Syndicate man
 Happy Humphrey as Tiny, a Syndicate man
 Bill Gribble as Cooter Pettigrew
 Bruce Atkins as Sheriff Rosco Coltrane
 Ben Jones as Agent Fred from Chicago

Production
Moonrunners was filmed during the fall of 1973 in Williamson and Haralson, Georgia. Many of the original filming locations have changed significantly since the film was produced. A comprehensive photo journal of filming locations as they exist now is part of the Hazzard County Car Club's website.

Legacy

Several names, places, and situations from the film were used in The Dukes of Hazzard, with little or no alteration. Waylon Jennings is the Balladeer, and the Boar's Nest is a tavern in both. Although toned down for the TV series, the relationship between cousins Bo and Luke Duke is similar to that of Bobby Lee and Grady in Moonrunners.

Uncle Jesse is the family patriarch. In both, he is a widowed, bearded moonshiner with strong religious beliefs, raising his nephews. They dress similarly, in overalls and a shirt. The film and series feature a corrupt county boss (Jake Rainey and Boss Hogg) who ran moonshine with Uncle Jesse, owns many local businesses, and bribes local law enforcement. Their opposing views and Jake's dishonesty make the Haggses and Rainey adversaries, as the Dukes and Boss Hogg were in the series. Sheriff Rosco P. Coltrane is a once-honest officer who turned to corruption with the county boss after he was cheated out of his pension. This theme carried over to the end of the first season of the series. Much of the Balladeer's dialogue introducing Rosco in Moonrunners is similar to that in Rosco's first scene in the first episode of The Dukes of Hazzard. In the film and series, the boys have a talented mechanic friend. On probation for running moonshine, they use hunting bows tipped with dynamite since they are forbidden to use firearms.

Other names or roles were altered, while retaining recognizable connections. In the film, Uncle Jesse and the boys have the surname Hagg; in the series, their antagonist's surname is Hogg. In Moonrunners, Beth Ann is an honest, naïve young woman in trouble who is taken in by the Haggs; the character resembles Daisy Duke, a member of the family. The Haggs' stock car is named Traveller after General Lee's horse, and the Dukes' stock car is named The General Lee. Jake Rainey is said to have organized-crime connections, and in early episodes of the TV series, Boss Hogg attempts to ally with a syndicate. Uncle Jesse's mule in the film is named Beauregard, a name which would be given to Bo (Beauregard) Duke in the series.

These actors appeared in both Moonrunners and The Dukes of Hazzard:
 Ben Jones as Fred (a revenue agent) in the film and the Dukes' best friend, Cooter Davenport, in the series
 C. Pete Munro as Zeebo in the film and Willie in the season-two episode, "Jude Emery"
 Bill Gribble as Cooter in the film and Carson in the second episode, "Daisy's Song"
 Jerry Rushing as Jake Rainey's bodyguard in the film and crooked used-car salesman Ace Parker in the fourth episode, "Repo Men"

See also
 List of American films of 1975

References

Further reading
  A "Moonrunner's" Tale:  From Grit to Gold: How "The Dukes" was Born

External links
 "Moonrunners"
 
 
 
 
 

1975 films
1970s action comedy films
American action comedy films
American auto racing films
American crime comedy films
Films about automobiles
Films adapted into television shows
Films set in Appalachia
Films shot in Georgia (U.S. state)
The Dukes of Hazzard films
United Artists films
American chase films
American adventure films
1975 comedy films
Moonshine in popular culture
1970s English-language films
1970s American films